Sopurghan (also Romanized as Sopūrghān; also known as Separghān, Soporghān, and Supurgan) is a village in Tala Tappeh Rural District, Nazlu District, Urmia County, West Azerbaijan Province, Iran. At the 2006 census, its population was 243, in 71 families.

Name 
According to Vladimir Minorsky, the name of this village is derived from the Mongolian word suburghan, meaning a stupa.

History
The earliest mention of Sopurghan is found in a letter to Pope Pius IV in 1562. The village is mentioned again in a manuscript donated to a church in Jerusalem in 1612. 

Evidence from tombstones in the village cemetery show Assyrian presence in the village as early as 668 AD. In 1840, American Protestant missionaries built a primary school in the region. In 1862, a Russian survey showed 172 families and 2 priests living in the village. In 1883, a missionary established girls' school in the village, and in 1887, and Anglican mission established a Middle School for boys below 17.

Location
Sopurghan is located 26 kilometres northeast of the city of Urmia and 2 kilometres from the edge of Lake Urmia.

References 

Populated places in Urmia County